Fern Forest is a census-designated place (CDP) in Hawaii County, Hawaii, United States, located in the District of Puna.  The population was 1,150 at the 2020 census. The population increased by 94.0% to 931 at the 2010 census.

Geography
Fern Forest is located at  (19.472132, -155.130135).

Demographics

As of the census of 2010, there were 931 people and 399 households residing in the CDP. There were 460 housing units at an average density of 23.1/sq mi (8.9/km2). The racial makeup of the CDP was 49.30% White, 0.75% African American, 0.86% American Indian & Alaska Native, 7.84% Asian, 10.63% Native Hawaiian & Pacific Islander, 0.64% from other races, and 29.97% from two or more races. Hispanic or Latino of any race were 13.53% of the population.

There were 399 households, out of which 20.1% had children under the age of 18 living with them. The average household size was 2.33.

In the CDP the population was spread out, with 21.4% under the age of 18, 7.5% from 18 to 24, 11.6% from 25 to 34, 19.4% from 35 to 49, 31.5% from 50–64, and 8.6% who were 65 years of age or older.  For every 100 females, there were 117.5 males.  For every 100 males there were 85.1 females.

The median income for a household in the CDP at the 2000 census was $24,519, and the median income for a family in 2000 was $33,125. Males had a median income of $40,125 versus $28,333 for females in 2000. The per capita income for the CDP was $14,958 in 2000.  About 18.3% of families and 25.5% of the population were below the poverty line in 2000, including 10.3% of those under age 18 and 36.8% of those age 65 or over.

References

Census-designated places in Hawaii County, Hawaii
Populated places on Hawaii (island)